Megachile angustistrigata is a species of bee in the family Megachilidae. It was described by Alfken in 1924.

References

Angustistrigata
Insects described in 1924